The siege of Syracuse in 868 was conducted by the Aghlabids against Syracuse in Sicily, then a possession of the Byzantine Empire, during the long Muslim conquest of Sicily. During the siege the Aghlabids defeated a Byzantine fleet which came to the relief of the city. Because the siege failed to take the city, the Muslims resorted to pillaging the countryside surrounding it before they retired. A decade later, the Aghlabids finally conquered the city after the siege of 877–878.

See also
 Siege of Syracuse (877–878)

References

Sources 
 
 

868
860s conflicts
Syracuse 868
Syracuse 868
Byzantine Sicily
History of Syracuse, Sicily
Military history of Sicily
860s in the Byzantine Empire